John Kenneth Caldwell (October 16, 1881 – June 27, 1982) was an American diplomat who served as Minister Resident and Consul General to multiple countries.

Early life

John Kenneth Caldwell was born on October 16, 1881, in Piketon, Ohio.

Career

In 1906, he began his career in diplomacy. In 1909, he served as deputy consul general in Yokohama, Japan. In 1911, he served as vice consul in Port Arthur in the Japanese Kwantung Leased Territory. From 1920 to 1921, he served as a consul in Kobe, Japan and later served as the secretary of the Tokyo embassy from 1921 to 1924. From 1932 to 1935, he served as a consul general in Sydney, Australia. From 1935 to 1941, he served as a consul general in Tientsin, China and maintained his position after the Japanese took control of the city.

From 1914 to 1920, he served as the consul in Vladivostok, Russia until he was reassigned to Kobe, Japan. During World War I he was tasked with aiding German prisoners of war in Siberia and later wrote a report on the Nikolayevsk incident that occurred during the Japanese intervention in Siberia.

On April 14, 1943, he was appointed by President Franklin D. Roosevelt to serve as the ambassador to Ethiopia under the title of consul general and presented his credentials on August 31, 1943. However, his title was later changed to Envoy Extraordinary and Minister Plenipotentiary on October 7, 1943, and he presented his credentials again on December 9, 1943. He would continue to serve as the ambassador to Ethiopia until August 26, 1945.

Later life

In 1948, he moved to Robles del Rio, California and later moved to Carmel, California in 1967. In 1971, his wife Grace died. In 1973, he wrote a memoir, but did not publish it. On June 27, 1982, he died.

References

External links

1881 births
1982 deaths
20th-century American diplomats
American consuls
People from Pike County, Ohio
Writers from Ohio
American centenarians
Men centenarians